Lisa Ginzburg (Rome, October 25, 1966) is an Italian author, translator and philosopher. She currently lives in Paris.

Biography
The daughter of Carlo Ginzburg and Anna Rossi-Doria, she graduated in Philosophy at the Sapienza University in Rome and further specialized her studies at the Scuola Normale Superiore in Pisa, Tuscany. At first, she dedicated her studies to French mysticism from the Seventeenth century (particularly worthy of being mentioned is the edition of Jeanne Guyon's A Commentary on the Song of Solomon, with the Italian title of Commento mistico al Cantico dei cantici, Genoa, Marietti, 1997). She also worked as a translator (among others, she translated Alexander Kojève's The Emperor Julian and His Art of Writing, with the Italian title of L'imperatore Giuliano e l'arte della scrittura, Roma, Donzelli, 1998 and William Shakespeare's Love's Labour's Lost, with the Italian title of Pene d'amore perdute, Torino, Einaudi, 2002). Moreover, she contributed to Italian newspapers and magazines, such as Il Messaggero and Domus. She edited, together with Cesare Garboli, È difficile parlare di sé, a multilateral conversation led by Marino Sinibaldi, which was published by Einaudi in 1999 and later translated into German (Es fällt schwer, von sich selbst zu sprechen, aber es ist schön, Berlin, Wagenbach, 2001) and English (It's hard to talk about yourself, Chicago, The University of Chicago Press, 2003).

She published the collection of stories, Colpi d'ala (Feltrinelli, 2006) and Spietati i mansueti (Gaffi, 2016), and the novels Desiderava la bufera (Feltrinelli, 2002), Per amore (Marsilio, 2016). In 2021 her novel Cara pace (Ponte alle Grazie, 2020) was shortlisted for the LXXV edition of the Strega Prize, nominated by Nadia Terranova.

Works
Mercati: viaggio nell'Italia che vende, Rome, Editori Riuniti, 2001
Desiderava la bufera, Milan, Feltrinelli, 2002
Anita: storia di Anita Garibaldi, Rome, E/O, 2005
Colpi d'ala, Milan, Feltrinelli, 2006
Malìa Bahia, Rome-Bari, Laterza, 2007
Per amore, Venice, Marsilio, 2016
Spietati i mansueti, Rome, Gaffi, 2016
Buongiorno mezzanotte, torno a casa, Rome, Italo Svevo, 2018
Pura invenzione. Dodici variazioni su Frankenstein di Mary Shelley, Venice, Marsilio, 2019
Cara pace, Milan, Ponte alle Grazie, 2020
Jeanne Moreau. La luce del rigore, Rome, Giulio Perrone, 2021

References

1966 births
Living people
Italian translators
21st-century Italian philosophers
Italian women philosophers
21st-century translators
21st-century Italian women writers
Writers from Rome
Sapienza University of Rome alumni
Scuola Normale Superiore di Pisa alumni